Mahasoa may refer to several places in Madagascar:

 Mahasoa, a municipality in Ihorombe (Ihosy District)
 Mahasoa Est, also known as Mahasoa Atsinanana, a municipality in Anosy
 Mahasoa Antindra, a municipality in Sava Region
 Mahasoabe, a municipality in Ihorombe